Choi Dae-young (born February 10, 1982 in Seoul) is a South Korean sport shooter. She competed at the 2000 Summer Olympics in the women's 10 metre air rifle event, in which she placed seventh.

References

1982 births
Living people
ISSF rifle shooters
South Korean female sport shooters
Shooters at the 2000 Summer Olympics
Olympic shooters of South Korea